"Let them eat cake" is a translation of the French "qu'ils mangent de la brioche", typically (though probably erroneously) attributed to Marie Antoinette.

Let them eat cake may also refer to:

Let 'Em Eat Cake, a Broadway musical that opened in 1933
Let Them Eat Cake (TV series), a 1999 BBC comedy TV series
Let Them Eat Cake (album), a 2000 Motorpsycho album 
Let 'Em Eat Cake, a 2014 Alexz Johnson album 
"Let Them Eat Cake", a 1993 episode of Rugrats
"Let 'Em Eat Cake" (Arrested Development), a 2004 episode of Arrested Development
"Let Them Eat Cake" (House), a 2008 episode of House
Let Them Eat Cake, a music festival on New Year's Day in the Werribee Park, Werribee, Australia
Let Them Eat Cake, a 2014 documentary film by Alexis Krasilovsky